Chhota Udaipur is a town and a municipality in Chhota Udaipur district  in the state of Gujarat, India. It is the headquarters of Chhota Udaipur district.

History

Chhota Udaipur was originally ruled by Bhil king , The last Bhil king of Chhota Udaipur was Kaliya Bhil in 1484. 
Chhota Udaipur was the capital of the erstwhile Princely State of Chhota Udaipur, founded in 1743 by Rawal Udeysinhji, a descendant of Patai Rawal of Champaner. This state was a First class state under Rewa Kantha Agency and merged with the Union of India on 10 March 1948.

Rulers (title Maharaja Maharawal)
        1762 –        1771  Arsisinhji
        1771 –        1777  Hamirsinhji II
        1777 –        1822  Bhimsinhji
        1822 –        1851  Gumansinhji
        1851 –        1881  Jitsinhji
        1881 –        1895  Motisinhji
        1895 – 29 Aug 1923  Fatehsinhji                        (b. 1884 – d. 1923)
 29 Aug 1923 – 15 Oct 1946  Natwarsinhji Fatehsinhji           (b. 1906 – d. 1946)
 15 Oct 1946 – 15 Aug 1947  Virendrasinhji                     (b. 1907- d. 27 June 2005)

Demographics
 India census, Chhota Udaipur had a population of 27,165. Males constitute 51% of the population and females 49%. Chhota Udaipur has an average literacy rate of 69%, higher than the national average of 59.5%; with male literacy of 76% and female literacy of 62%. 11% of the population is under 6 years of age.

Culture
The Kali Niketan (Nahar Mahal) palace, built as the summer residence of the erstwhile royal family is a notable monument in Chhota Udaipur. Chhota Udaipur is also known for the Rathwas in and around the city. The Rathwas are known for Pithora painting, usually carried out on the walls of the village houses. The tribal museum of Chhota Udaipur has a large collection of tribal artefacts. Many tribal artefacts are also brought for sale in the hats (weekly markets) in the city and nearby villages. Industries in largest dolomite lums and powder.

References

Cities and towns in Chhota Udaipur district